Jeremiah Neterer (January 24, 1862 – February 2, 1943) was a United States district judge of the United States District Court for the Western District of Washington.

Education and career

Born in Goshen, Indiana, Neterer received a Bachelor of Laws from Valparaiso University School of Law in 1885. He was in private practice in Bellingham, Washington from 1890 to 1913, serving as the city attorney of Bellingham in 1893. He became a Judge of the Superior Court Whatcom County, Washington in 1901.

Federal judicial service

Neterer received a recess appointment from President Woodrow Wilson on March 4, 1913, to a seat on the United States District Court for the Western District of Washington vacated by Judge Clinton Woodbury Howard. He was nominated to the same position by President Wilson on July 2, 1913. He was confirmed by the United States Senate on July 21, 1913, and received his commission the same day. He assumed senior status on May 31, 1933. His service terminated on February 2, 1943, due to his death.

References

Sources
 

1862 births
1943 deaths
Judges of the United States District Court for the Western District of Washington
United States district court judges appointed by Woodrow Wilson
20th-century American judges